The 1848 United States presidential election in Maryland took place on November 7, 1848, as part of the 1848 United States presidential election. Voters chose eight representatives, or electors to the Electoral College, who voted for president and vice president.

Maryland voted for the Whig candidate, Zachary Taylor, over Democratic candidate Lewis Cass. Taylor won Maryland by a narrow margin of 4.38%.

Results

Results by county

Counties that flipped from Whig to Democratic
Caroline
Talbot

See also
 United States presidential elections in Maryland
 1848 United States presidential election
 1848 United States elections

Notes

References 

Maryland
1848
Presidential